Silis is a genus of soldier beetles in the family Cantharidae, found mostly in Europe and the Americas. There are at least 80 described species in Silis.

Species
These 88 species belong to the genus Silis:

 Silis abdominalis Schaeffer, 1908 i g
 Silis abrupta Green, 1966 i g
 Silis abstrusa Green, 1966 i g
 Silis acuta Green, 1966 i g
 Silis alexanderi Fender, 1972 i g
 Silis angelica Green, 1966 i g
 Silis angulata Green, 1966 i g
 Silis arida Green, 1966 i g
 Silis arizonica van Dyke, 1918 i g
 Silis atra LeConte, 1884 i g
 Silis barri Green, 1966 i g
 Silis barticana Pic, 1908 g
 Silis bidentata (Say, 1825) i
 Silis californica Fender, 1948 i g
 Silis carbo van Dyke, 1918 i g
 Silis carmelita Green, 1966 i g b
 Silis cava LeConte, 1874 i g
 Silis constricta Green, 1966 i g
 Silis crucialis Green, 1966 i g b
 Silis dentigera Green, 1966 i g
 Silis deserticola van Dyke, 1918 i g
 Silis difficilis LeConte in Agassiz, 1850 i b
 Silis disjuncta Green, 1966 i g
 Silis divaricata Green, 1966 i g
 Silis egregia Green, 1966 i g
 Silis emarginata Green, 1966 i g
 Silis eximia Green, 1966 i g
 Silis fabulosa Green, 1966 i g
 Silis fenderi Green, 1966 i g
 Silis fenestrata van Dyke, 1918 i g
 Silis filicornis van Dyke, 1918 i g
 Silis filigera LeConte, 1874 i g
 Silis flavida LeConte, 1874 i g
 Silis fossiger LeConte, 1881 i g
 Silis freemani Brown, 1940 i g
 Silis greeni Fender, 1971 i g
 Silis howdeni Green, 1966 i g
 Silis humeralis Pic, 1909 g
 Silis incongrua Green, 1966 i g
 Silis insolita Green, 1966 i g
 Silis insperata Green, 1966 i g
 Silis introversa Green, 1966 i g
 Silis knulli Green, 1966 i g
 Silis lasseni Green, 1966 i g
 Silis latilobus Blatchley, 1910 i g
 Silis latistylus Green, 1966 i g
 Silis lecontei Green, 1966 i g
 Silis lemoulti Pic, 1909 g
 Silis lobata Green, 1966 i g
 Silis lutea LeConte in Melsheimer, 1853 i g b
 Silis macclayi Green, 1966 i g
 Silis maritima van Dyke, 1918 i g
 Silis montanica Green, 1966 i g
 Silis nevadica Green, 1966 i g
 Silis nigerrima Schaeffer, 1908 i g
 Silis nitidula (Fabricius, 1792) g
 Silis obtusa LeConte, 1874 i g
 Silis oregonensis Green, 1966 i g
 Silis pallida Mannerheim, 1843 i g b
 Silis parallela Green, 1966 i g
 Silis percomis (Say, 1835) i g b
 Silis perfoliata Green, 1966 i g
 Silis perforata LeConte, 1881 i g
 Silis peruviana Pic, 1906 g
 Silis protracta Green, 1966 i g
 Silis proxima Green, 1966 i g
 Silis recta Green, 1966 i g
 Silis reversa Green, 1966 i g
 Silis rogueti Constantin, 2012 g
 Silis ruficollis (Fabricius, 1775) g
 Silis rugosa van Dyke, 1918 i g
 Silis simulata Green, 1966 i g
 Silis singularis Green, 1966 i g
 Silis solitaria Green, 1966 i g
 Silis spathulata LeConte, 1881 i g b
 Silis spinigera LeConte, 1874 i g b
 Silis spinigerula Fender, 1972 i g
 Silis striatella Green, 1966 i g
 Silis subimpressa Pic, 1909 g
 Silis subtruncata Green, 1966 i g
 Silis tardella Green, 1966 i g
 Silis tenuata Green, 1966 i g
 Silis thermalis Green, 1966 i g
 Silis tricornis van Dyke, 1918 i g
 Silis triplicata Green, 1966 i g
 Silis ursina Green, 1966 i g
 Silis vandykei Green, 1966 i g
 Silis vulnerata LeConte, 1874 i g

Data sources: i = ITIS, c = Catalogue of Life, g = GBIF, b = Bugguide.net

References

Further reading

External links

 

Cantharidae
Articles created by Qbugbot